Kwai Luen Estate is a public housing estate in Kwai Shing, Kwai Chung, New Territories, Hong Kong. It consists of four residential blocks completed in 2011 and 2014 respectively. It was one of the public housing estates detected to have excessive lead contents in its water supply in 2015.

Houses

Demographics
According to the 2016 by-census, Kwai Luen Estate had a population of 7,616. The median age was 36 and the majority of residents (98.7 per cent) were of Chinese ethnicity. The average household size was 2.5 people. The median monthly household income of all households (i.e. including both economically active and inactive households) was HK$17,000.

Politics
Kwai Luen Estate is located in Kwai Luen constituency of the Kwai Tsing District Council. It was formerly represented by Ng Kim-sing, who was elected in the 2019 elections until July 2021.

See also

Public housing estates in Kwai Chung

References

Residential buildings completed in 2011
Kwai Chung
Public housing estates in Hong Kong
2011 establishments in Hong Kong